The Joint Stock Companies Act 1844 (7 & 8 Vict. c.110) was an Act of the Parliament of the United Kingdom that expanded access to the incorporation of joint-stock companies.

Before the Act, incorporation was possible only by royal charter or private Act and was limited owing to Parliament's protection of the privileges and advantages thereby granted. As a result, many businesses came to be operated as unincorporated associations with possibly thousands of members. Any consequent litigation had to be carried out in the joint names of all the members and was almost impossibly cumbersome. Though Parliament would sometimes grant a private act to allow an individual to represent the whole in legal proceedings, this was a narrow and necessarily costly expedient, allowed only to established companies.

The 1844 Act created the Registrar of Joint Stock Companies, empowered to register companies by a two-stage process. The first, provisional, stage cost £5 and did not confer corporate status, which arose after completing the second stage for another £5.

However, there was still no limited liability and company members could still be held responsible for unlimited losses by the company. Limited liability was subsequently introduced by the Limited Liability Act 1855. The system of registration was revised by the Joint Stock Companies Act 1856. The aim of the act was to place business and economy on a surer foundation and to increase public confidence in the honesty of business.

See also
Bubble Act 1720
Companies Act
Limited Liability Act 1855
Joint Stock Companies Act 1856
Utopia, Limited

Notes

Bibliography

1844 in British law
United Kingdom Acts of Parliament 1844
History of corporate law
United Kingdom company law